Alabama Song (2007) is a French-language novel by French novelist Gilles Leroy. It is a fictional autobiography of Zelda Fitzgerald, wife of F. Scott Fitzgerald. Although Gilles Leroy always insisted the book was not a biography but a novel, it relied on a large body of factual research. It won the Prix Goncourt in 2007, one of the most important French literary awards.

See also
 2007 in literature
 Contemporary French literature

References

2007 French novels
French autobiographical novels
Prix Goncourt winning works